Pattanan Pijittham (born February 2, 1989), simply known as Champ, is a Thai professional footballer who plays as a goalkeeper for Thai League 2 club Kasetsart.

Club career

External links
 Profile at Goal
 

1989 births
Living people
Pattanan Pijittham
Pattanan Pijittham
Association football goalkeepers
Pattanan Pijittham
Pattanan Pijittham
Pattanan Pijittham
Pattanan Pijittham
Pattanan Pijittham
Pattanan Pijittham